Daniel Anthony Hart (August 24, 1927 – January 14, 2008) was an American prelate of the Catholic Church. He served as Bishop of Norwich from 1995 to 2003.

Biography
Daniel Hart was born in Lawrence, Massachusetts, the third son of John and Susan (née Tierney) Hart. After graduating from Central Catholic High School in Lawrence, he entered Boston College, from where he obtained a Bachelor of Science degree in business administration. He then studied at St. John's Seminary in Brighton, earning a Master of Divinity degree in 1953. He was ordained to the priesthood by Cardinal Richard Cushing on February 2, 1953. He then served as a curate at Our Lady of the Assumption Church in Lynnfield until 1954, when he was assigned to complete his graduate studies at Boston College. In addition to his studies, he served at St. Paul Church in Wellesley.

He returned to parish ministry as a curate at Sacred Heart Church in Malden. In 1964 he became vice-chancellor of the Archdiocese of Boston. From 1970 to 1976, he was a curate at St. John the Baptist Church in Peabody. During that period, he was also elected president of the Archdiocesan Senate of Priests. He also earned a Master of Education degree, with a major in pastoral counseling, from Boston State College in 1972.

On August 24, 1976, Hart was appointed Auxiliary Bishop of Boston and Titular Bishop of Tepelta by Pope Paul VI. He received his episcopal consecration on October 18 from Cardinal Humberto Sousa Medeiros, with Bishops Thomas Joseph Riley and Lawrence Joseph Riley serving as co-consecrators, at the Cathedral of the Holy Cross. As an auxiliary bishop, he served as regional bishop for the South Pastoral Region. Following the transfer of Bishop Daniel Patrick Reilly to Diocese of Worcester, Hart was named the fourth Bishop of Norwich, Connecticut, on September 12, 1995. He was installed at the Cathedral of St. Patrick on the following November 1. During his eight-year-long, Hart raised over $15 million through his "Response of Faith Campaign" in 1998 for the support and maintenance of diocesan services. He also expanded the diocesan Catholic Charities.

Upon reaching the mandatory retirement age of 75, Hart submitted his letter of resignation to Pope John Paul II in August 2002. His resignation was accepted on March 11, 2003, and he was succeeded by Bishop Michael Richard Cote, then-auxiliary bishop of the Diocese of Portland, Maine. After a six-month-long battle with cancer, Hart died at St. Joseph Living Center in Windham, aged 80. He is buried at St. Joseph Cemetery in Norwich.

See also

 Catholic Church hierarchy
 Catholic Church in the United States
 Historical list of the Catholic bishops of the United States
 List of Catholic bishops of the United States
 Lists of patriarchs, archbishops, and bishops

References

External links 
Roman Catholic Diocese of Norwich

Episcopal succession

1927 births
2008 deaths
People from Lawrence, Massachusetts
Roman Catholic bishops of Norwich
Carroll School of Management alumni
Saint John's Seminary (Massachusetts) alumni
Boston State College alumni
Catholics from Massachusetts
20th-century Roman Catholic bishops in the United States